The Assigned Servant is a 1911 Australian silent film about a convict who is transported to Van Diemen's Land. It was made by the husband-and-wife team of John and Agnes Gavin and is considered a lost film.

Plot
In England, Ralph Frawley is arrested for rabbit poaching and transported to Van Diemen's Land as a convict. He is assigned as a servant to a settler and falls in love with the daughter of the house. He marries her in secret but when this is revealed he is sent back to prison to serve the rest of his term. He escapes by a spectacular leap and swims to freedom. He turns to bushranging and robs the mail coach. He is saved by his aboriginal friend during a fight with police. After learning his wife has died he returns to England.

Cast
John Gavin
Alf Scarlett
Charles Woods
Dore Kurtz
Sid Harrison
Agnes Gavin

Production
Filming took under a month, which over a week spent on location. During the shoot, two actors injured themselves during a scene where they fought on top of a cliff and fell twenty feet below into the water. The actor Frank Gardiner cut his head falling from a horse during a chase scene, and an actor playing a trooper had four teeth knocked out during a fight.

Filming took place in the National Park, with Georges River heavily featured.

Reception
According to Gavin the film was a big success.

References

External links

The Assigned Servant at the National Film and Sound Archive

1911 films
Australian black-and-white films
Australian silent feature films
Films set in colonial Australia
Films directed by John Gavin
Lost Australian films
1911 lost films
Silent drama films
Lost drama films